In the United States an irrigation district is a cooperative, self-governing public corporation set up as a subdivision of the State government, with definite geographic boundaries, organized, and having taxing power to obtain and distribute water for irrigation of lands within the district; created under the authority of a State legislature with the consent of a designated fraction of the landowners or citizens.

It is a special-purpose district created by statute in order to develop large irrigation projects.
These districts have the power to tax, borrow, and condemn.

Sample districts

See also 
Deficit irrigation
Huerta
Irrigation District Act of 1916 (Smith Act)
Irrigation Districts and Farm Loans Act
Water district

References

External links 
 Federal lands included in state irrigation districts
 "The Nevada Irrigation District Act"

 
Types of administrative division